Menaka is a 1935 Indian Tamil-language drama film directed by P. K. Rajasandow and produced by Sri Shanmuganandha Talkie Company. The film stars T. K. Shanmugam and T. K. Bhagavathi with N. S. Krishnan (in his cinematic debut), S. V. Sahasranamam, K. R. Ramasamy and T. K. Muthusamy in supporting roles. The film is about two lovers who get separated because of the designs of some envious persons and their reunion after much anguish and anxiety.

Menaka was an adaptation of the stage play of the same name which itself was adapted from a novel of the same name written by Vaduvoor K. Duraiswamy Iyengar. The film's screenplay was written by Kandhasamy Mudaliar. The film was released on 6 April 1935 became successful at the box-office and created a trendsetter for social themed films in Tamil.

Plot

Cast 
The list was adapted from the database of Film News Anandan

Male cast
T. K. Shanmugam as Naina Mohamed
T. K. Bhagavathi as Varaswami
T. K. Sankaran as Sambasiva Iyer
T. K. Muthusami as Perundevi
P. K. Diwakar
N. S. Krishnan as Sama Iyer
S. V. Sahasranamam
K. R. Ramasami
Mohideen

Female cast
M. S. Vijayal as Menaka
K. T. Rukmini as Noorjehan
T. K. Rajasundari
T. K. Vimala

Production 
M. Somasundaram who earlier worked as entrepreneur in Coimbatore decided to venture into film production along with partner S. K. Mohideen. For their debut film, they decided to produce a film adaptation of stage play Menaka which was staged by TKS Brothers for which Somasundaram bought the story rights for 16,000. Male actor T. K. Muthusamy portrayed Perundhevi, a widow since no female was willing to shave her their head for the role.

N. S. Krishnan who portrayed a comic negative role in the play reprised the role in the film which also marked his acting debut. During the shoot, he was initially reluctant to be a part of a scene where he was supposed to be tied together with an actress. Krishnan jokingly remarked that "being a chaste man, only his wife should touch him". Rajasandow who understood the humour became friends with Krishnan. The film was entirely shot at Ranjith Studios, Bombay and was completed within 3 months with the cost of 80,000 (worth 16 crore in 2021 prices).

Award 
The film won an award from the Government of the Madras Presidency.

Remake 
The film was remade in 1955 with the same title by V. C. Subbaraman. K. R. Ramasamy, who portrayed a comic role in the 1935 version played a leading role in this version. However this version failed to replicate the success of the 1935 version.

Legacy 
Menaka was the first Tamil film where a novel was adapted into a feature film and the success of the film also triggered a series of social themed films in Tamil cinema. The film made N. S. Krishnan popular and he went on to become a famous comedian in Tamil.

References

External links 
 

1935 drama films
1930s Tamil-language films
1935 films
Films about social issues in India
Films based on Indian novels
Indian black-and-white films
Indian drama films
Indian films based on plays